Sandro Cuomo (born 21 October 1962) is an Italian former épée fencer. He won a team gold medal at the 1996 Summer Olympics and a team bronze at the 1984 Summer Olympics. He is also three-time team world champion. He is director of épée at the Italian Fencing Federation.

References

External links
 

1962 births
Living people
Italian male fencers
Italian épée fencers
Italian fencing coaches
Olympic fencers of Italy
Fencers at the 1984 Summer Olympics
Fencers at the 1988 Summer Olympics
Fencers at the 1992 Summer Olympics
Fencers at the 1996 Summer Olympics
Olympic gold medalists for Italy
Olympic bronze medalists for Italy
Olympic medalists in fencing
Fencers from Naples
Medalists at the 1984 Summer Olympics
Medalists at the 1996 Summer Olympics
20th-century Italian people